Ravenscar is a coastal village in the Scarborough district of North Yorkshire, England.

A National Trail, the  Cleveland Way, passes through Ravenscar, which is also the eastern terminus of the Lyke Wake Walk. The official end of the walk is at a point where the path meets the coast road.

History 

Ravenscar was the location of a late 4th century Roman signal station, part of a chain that extended along the Yorkshire coast.

To the north of the village is the old Peak alum works, now a National Trust site, but once an important part of the dyeing industry. The last alum works at Ravenscar closed down in 1871 after the invention of a synthetic dye fixer.

At the edge of the village is a disused windmill, Peak Mill, which dates from 1858.

Until the early 20th century Ravenscar was known as 'Peak' or 'The Peak'.

At the turn of the 19th–20th century, plans were made to turn the village into a holiday resort to rival nearby Scarborough. Roads were laid out, some houses were built and sewers were laid. Because of the long trek to its rocky beach, Ravenscar never achieved popularity, and the development was left unfinished – a town with sewers and streets but no houses.

The village was served by Ravenscar railway station between 1885 and 1965.

Peak House/Raven Hall

In 1540, a farm known as Peak House owned by the Beswick family occupied the site of a 5th-century Roman fort. In 1774 Raven Hall was built on the site for Captain William Childs of London, a captain in the King's Regiment of Light Dragoons, who came to Yorkshire with the army and became the owner of the Alum Works at Ravenscar. On his death in 1829 the hall passed to his daughter Ann Willis, whose family (headed by Dr Francis Willis) had become wealthy from treating George III and other royalty for their medical conditions. Ann's son, the eccentric Rev Dr Richard Willis, built the gardens and battlements which surround the house. In 1845 the property passed into the hands of William Hammond of London.

Hammond became a prominent local benefactor, building the village church and the windmill. He became a director of the Scarborough to Whitby railway line, insisting that it passed through his property via a tunnel and that Ravenscar should have a station.

On his widow's death in 1890 the estate was sold to the Peak Estate Company for development as a holiday resort. The house was extended for use as a hotel from 1895, and its golf course opened in 1898. It was sold by auction in 1911 after the company went bankrupt, and after several changes of ownership and use as a billet in wartime it was acquired by the present owners, who are associated with Classic Hotels.

Popular culture 
The name of the village is featured in a double episode (The Swords of Wayland) of the 1980s television show, Robin of Sherwood. The locations for Ravenscar, as featured in the episodes, were filmed at Cornwall and Somerset. The exterior of Ravenscar Castle was Saint Michael's Mount, and the interior, in particular the room where the seven swords were kept, was Wells Cathedral. Scenes for the German TV crime drama, The Search were filmed on location in Ravenscar in 2020.

The comic book anti-hero John Constantine was committed to the (fictional) Ravenscar Lunatic Asylum in the Hellblazer series of comics after a disastrous summoning. He returned there throughout the series.

The fictional character Roger Comstock in the Baroque Cycle by Neal Stephenson has the royal title "Marquis of Ravenscar".

References

External links

Staintondale Parish Council website
Villages in North Yorkshire
Populated coastal places in North Yorkshire
Borough of Scarborough